Gyumri City Stadium is an all-seater football stadium in Gyumri, Armenia. It is currently the home venue of the Armenian Premier League club FC Shirak of Gyumri. The current capacity of the stadium is 4,000 seats.

History
The stadium was built and opened in 1924 to become the first stadium in the modern history of Armenia. When Shirak was founded in 1958, the stadium became the regular home ground of the team for the Soviet First League competition. Starting from 1991, the stadium witnessed many glorious moments of FC Shirak in the Armenian Premier League and the Armenian Independence Cup. The stadium hosted the 2011–12 Armenian Cup final match when Shirak defeated Impulse to win the title for the first time in their history.

The venue was reconstructed in 1999 and turned into an all-seater stadium. The total capacity of the stadium became 2,844 seats (1,413 at the western stand and 1,431 at the eastern stand). 

During 2012, the playing pitch and many other facilities were entirely renovated to meet the UEFA standards.

As of 2014, the stadium is the home ground of Shirak for the domestic competitions since 1958. However, after the most recent developments in 2012, the stadium was permitted to be used by the club for their home games at the European competitions.

On 12 July 2012, Shirak hosted Rudar Pljevlja at the Gyumri City Stadium, in the qualifying phase of the 2012–13 UEFA Europa League. The match ended in a 1-1 draw, allowing FC Shirak to advance with a 2-1 win on aggregate.

After the most recent renovation took place during summer 2019, the capacity of the stadium was increased from 2,844 up to 4,500 seats, following the installment of new seats at the southern end of the stadium.

References

Shirak SC
Sports venues completed in 1924
Sports venues built in the Soviet Union
Football venues in Armenia
Buildings and structures in Gyumri